Piz Forun is a mountain of the Albula Alps, located east of Bergün in the canton of Graubünden.

References

External links
 Piz Forun on Hikr

Mountains of Switzerland
Mountains of Graubünden
Mountains of the Alps
Alpine three-thousanders
Bergün Filisur